HD 142 b is a jovian exoplanet approximately 85.5 light years away in the constellation of Phoenix. This planet was discovered in 2001 by the Anglo-Australian Planet Search team.

An astrometric measurement of the planet's inclination and true mass was published in 2022 as part of Gaia DR3.

References

External links
 
 

Phoenix (constellation)
Exoplanets discovered in 2001
Giant planets
Exoplanets detected by radial velocity
Exoplanets detected by astrometry

es:HD 142#HD 142 b